Borussia Dortmund II are the reserve team of Borussia Dortmund. They play in the 3. Liga, at Stadion Rote Erde. Until 2005, the team played as Borussia Dortmund Amateure.

History

From Kreisliga to Oberliga (Until 1997)
The second team of Borussia Dortmund initially played at the Kreisliga and was promoted to the Bezirksliga in 1957. After a third-place finish in 1957, they were promoted into the Landesliga Westfalen in 1964. In 1969, Borussia Dortmund II won the Landesliga Westfalen eight points clear of Teutonia Lippstadt, gaining promotion into the Westfalenliga, the highest amateur league in Westphalia at the time. Three years later, the team got relegated into the Landesliga, and even into the Bezirksliga in 1974.

In 1977, the team gained promotion again into the Landesliga. In the 1977–78 season, the team finished fifth, missing out the promotion play-off by just two points. The team returned to the Westfalenliga in 1983 and went on to become one of the leading teams in the league. In 1987, Borussia Dortmund II finished three points ahead of SV Langedreer 04 and gained promotion into the Oberliga Westfalen. The team finished fourth on the table in 1989, 1991 and 1993, before finishing eighth in 1994, missing out promotion into the then newly established Regionalliga West/Südwest.

Meanwhile, the team reached the final of the 1991 Westphalia Cup, losing 1–6 against Arminia Bielefeld. Because of that, the team was eligible for the first and only time for the DFB Cup. The team met 1. FC Saarbrucken in the first round of the 1991/92 season, with the Saarland club going through at 5–2 in front of 1,800 fans at the Stadion Rote Erde.

Between Regionalliga and Oberliga (1994 to 2007)
Borussia Dortmund continued to play in the Oberliga Westfalen and was runner-up behind FC Gütersloh in 1995. In 1998, under the guidance of coach Michael Skibbe, the team were crowned champions of Oberliga Westfalen with a ten-point advantage ahead of FC Schalke 04 II. In the following season in the Regionalliga, the team finished fourth last, inside the relegation zone. The team, however, avoided the drop, benefiting from the fact that two higher-ranked teams in Wuppertaler SV and FC 08 Homburg were relegated for failing to pay dues to the league. In 2000, under coach Edwin Boekamp, the team managed a mid-table finish and qualified for the newly created two-tier Regionalliga in the following season.

The team was relegated at the end of the 2000/01 season, finishing second last but managed to gain promotion back into the league under coach Horst Koppel in the following season. After a fifth-place finish in the 2002/03 season, the team stayed in the Regionalliga for a further two years and was relegated back to the Oberliga at the end of the 2004/05 campaign only by a two-goal goal difference against Chemnitzer FC, who managed a goalless draw against the already-relegated KFC Uerdingen 05 in the last round. The team again staged a direct comeback the following season, this time under coach Theo Schneider. In the 2006/07 season, Borussia Dortmund II had more luck than two years ago and managed to avoid relegation on goal difference against Holstein Kiel in the league.

2007–present
In 2008, Borussia Dortmund II finished thirteenth in the Regionalliga and failed to qualify for the then newly created 3. Liga by a four-point margin. A year later, the team managed to win the Regionalliga West three points ahead of the 1. FC Kaiserslautern and secured promotion to the 3. Liga under coach Theo Schneider. Finishing third from bottom in the 2009/10 season, the team was relegated. In Summer 2011, David Wagner took over as coach of Borussia Dortmund II. With a 5–3 win at Wuppertaler SV Borussia on the final day of the 2011/12 season, the team gained promotion into the 3. Liga again.

On 9 August 2014, the Stadion Rote Erde was sold out with 9,999 spectators for the first time in its history at a home match of Borussia Dortmund II. It was Matchday 4 of the 2014/15 3. Liga season at home against SSV Jahn Regensburg. The game was part of a family day and the inauguration of a fan shop near the stadium.

On 5 June 2021, Borussia Dortmund II confirmed their promotion back to the 3. Liga, as they won the 2020–21 Regionalliga West with a 2–1 win over Wuppertaler SV.

Honours
Regionalliga West
Winners: 2008–09, 2011–12, 2020–21
Oberliga Westfalen
Winners: 1997–98, 2001–02, 2005–06
Runners-up: 1994–95
Westphalia Cup
Runners-up: 1990–91

Recent seasons
The recent season-by-season performance of the club:

 With the introduction of the Regionalligas in 1994 and the 3. Liga in 2008 as the new third tier, below the 2. Bundesliga, all leagues below dropped one tier. In 2000 all clubs from the disbanded Regionalliga West/Südwest from North Rhine-Westphalia joint the Regionalliga Nord, in 2008 these clubs left the league again to join the new Regionalliga West.

Stadium

Borussia Dortmund II plays their matches at the Stadion Rote Erde, which has a capacity of 9,999 for league matches. The stadium belongs to the City of Dortmund. The stadium came under criticism several times due to inadequate space, lack of soil heating and the poor condition of the infrastructure. Because of this, Borussia Dortmund is considering the purchase of the stadium.

Players

Current squad

Out on loan

Current staff

Head coaches

References

External links

Borussia Dortmund II at Weltfussball.de 

North Rhine-Westphalia reserve football teams
German reserve football teams
Borussia Dortmund
Football clubs in Germany
Sport in Dortmund